Mexico–Vietnam relations are the diplomatic relations between Mexico and Vietnam. Both nations are members of the Asia-Pacific Economic Cooperation, Forum of East Asia-Latin America Cooperation and the United Nations.

History 
Mexico and Vietnam are two nations that share a common history in the fact that both nations at one time were under the influence of the Second French Empire: the colony of French Indochina (including Vietnam) and the French-backed Second Mexican Empire. In 1945, Vietnam declared independence from France and soon Vietnam entered into the First Indochina War (1946-1954) and then the Vietnam War (1955-1975). During the Vietnam war, Mexico remained neutral. After the war ended in April 1975, both nations soon established diplomatic relations with each other that same year. Later that same year, Vietnam opened an embassy in Mexico City and Mexico followed suit by opening an embassy in Hanoi in 1976; however, Mexico closed its embassy in 1980 due to financial reasons. Mexico re-opened its embassy in October 2000.

In 1979, Vietnamese Prime Minister Phạm Văn Đồng paid an official visit to Mexico. In 2011, Mexico unveiled a statue of Chairman Ho Chi Minh in Mexico City. In 2015, both nations celebrated 40 years of diplomatic relations. In November 2017, Mexican President Enrique Peña Nieto paid a visit to Vietnam to attend the APEC summit in Da Nang and met with President Trần Đại Quang.

High-level visits

High-level visits from Mexico to Vietnam

 President Enrique Peña Nieto (2017)

High-level visits from Vietnam to Mexico

 Prime Minister Phạm Văn Đồng (1979)
 First Deputy Prime Minister Nguyễn Tấn Dũng (2001)
 Prime Minister Phan Văn Khải (2002)

Bilateral agreements
Both nations have signed several bilateral agreements such as an Agreement on the suppression of Visa Requirements for Official and Diplomatic Passport Holders of both nations (2002); Memorandum of Understanding for the Establishment of a Mechanism of Consultations and an Agreement of Educational and Cultural Cooperation (2002); Agreement on Technical and Scientific Cooperation (2011); Agreement in Agriculture and Forestry (2011) and an Agreement on Economic, Trade and Investment Cooperation (2016).

Trade relations 
In 2018, two-way trade between both nations amounted to US$4 billion. Mexico's main exports to Vietnam include: shrimp, lobsters, calamari, tractors, flour, meat, and alcohol (beer). Vietnam's main exports to Mexico include: electronics, electrical circuits and textiles. Vietnam is Mexico's 12th largest trading partner in the Asia-Pacific region.  Both nations have worked closely as founding members of the Trans-Pacific Partnership.

Resident diplomatic missions 
 Mexico has an embassy in Hanoi.
 Vietnam has an embassy in Mexico City.

References

 
Vietnam
Bilateral relations of Vietnam